The Idroscalo is an artificial lake in Milan, Italy that was originally constructed as a seaplane airport. It opened on 28 October 1930, in the heyday of seaplanes. When the use of seaplanes for passenger transport declined it became a recreational and sport facility.

It is situated between the municipalities of Segrate and Peschiera Borromeo, just within Milan's city limits and near Linate Airport.

Idroscalo today 
Idroscalo is now owned by the Province of Milan which has transformed it into a park. The place hosts many recreational activities and is now sometimes known as the "Sea of Milan". The province manages the park and the  social and sporting activities within it. Recent sponsorship by the Fila sportwear company allowed the park's facilities to be improved to allow water-skiing, free climbing, a mountain bike track and running paths. The park was renamed Idropark Fila for the period of the sponsorship.

Sports within the park include kayaking, canoeing, dragon boats, rowing, sailing, swimming, horse riding and water skiing. The park is used by the Idroscalo Club, Lega Navale Italiana, and CPPC sports clubs. The lake's first rowing races were in 1934. European Rowing Championships were held on the lake in 1938 and in 1950.

Moreover, the Idroscalo has bars and nightclubs which have been the venue for open-air concerts including the Italian metal festivals Gods of Metal and Evolution Festival.

Europark Idroscalo Milano is a nearby family-oriented amusement park, open from March to September and on weekends during the rest of the year. It was originally called Lunapark Milano and was constructed in 1965.

In popular culture

See also
Europark Idroscalo Milano

References

External links
 Official website

Artificial lakes of Italy
Lakes of Lombardy
Geography of Milan
Rowing venues
Canoeing and kayaking venues
Transport in Milan
Segrate
Peschiera Borromeo